The 1980 Summer Olympics, officially known as the Games of the XXII Olympiad, were an international multi-sport event held in Moscow, Russian SFSR, Soviet Union from 19 July to 3 August. A total of 5,179 athletes representing 80 National Olympic Committees (NOCs) participated in 203 events in 22 sports. They were the first Games to be staged in a communist nation.

66 countries participated in a boycott against these Games as a protest against the Soviet invasion of Afghanistan. Fifteen countries marched in the Opening Ceremony with the Olympic Flag instead of their national flags, and the Olympic Flag and Olympic Hymn were used at medal ceremonies when athletes from these countries won medals. Competitors from three countries – New Zealand, Portugal, and Spain – competed under the flags of their respective National Olympic Committees. Some of these teams that marched under flags other than their national flags were depleted by boycotts by individual athletes, while some athletes did not participate in the march.

Of the eighty participating nations, the smallest number since 1956, six nations made their first appearance at this Games – Angola, Botswana, Cyprus, Laos, Mozambique, and Seychelles. None of these nations won a medal. Whilst competitors from 36 countries became Olympic medalists, the great majority of the medals were taken by the host country and East Germany in what was the most skewed medal tally since 1904. Despite only being invited to compete five weeks prior to the opening ceremony, Zimbabwe won a surprise gold medal in the sport of women's field hockey. The Soviet Union's Aleksandr Dityatin became the first athlete to win eight medals at a single Games, with three gold, four silver and a bronze medal. In rowing, the winners of both the gold and silver medals in the coxless pairs were identical twins.

Guyana, Tanzania, and Zimbabwe  won their first-ever Olympic medals.

Amidst a heavy boycott, the Soviet Union dominated, winning a record 80 gold medals (although since surpassed by the United States), and their 195 total medals are the second best result in history. Sports commentators noted that the absence of the United States and various other Western nations stemming from an unprecedented boycott contributed to the highly skewed medal results benefitting the Soviet Union and East Germany.


Medal table

The medal table is based on information provided by the International Olympic Committee (IOC) and is consistent with IOC convention in its published medal tables. By default, the table is ordered by the number of gold medals the athletes from a nation have won (in this context, a nation is an entity represented by a National Olympic Committee). The number of silver medals is taken into consideration next and then the number of bronze medals. If nations are still tied, equal ranking is given and they are listed alphabetically.

In boxing and judo two bronze medals were awarded in each weight class.  Therefore, the total number of bronze medals is greater than the total number of gold or silver medals.

References

External links
 
 
 
 

Medal count
Summer Olympics medal tables